Ndagano Junior (born 25 October 1985) is a Rwandan-born Belgian football player who is currently out of contract.

Ndagano is a versatile left-sided forward or defender.  He began his career at youth level with K.V. Turnhout before being signed by K.R.C. Genk as a 16-year-old.  After two seasons at Genk he moved to KV Mechelen but did not managed to break into the first team.  Since then he has played for a range of European clubs, including a spell with Paris FC, his most consistent period coming with Dessel Sport in the second division.
 
In 2011 Ndagano Junior was selected as part of a group of European players with Rwandan heritage to make a friendly tour of Rwanda.  This led to him eventually being called up to the Rwandan National team.

References

External links
http://www.stamnummer25.be/wp-content/upLoads/wedstrijdfiches-reserven-2004-2005.pdf
http://www.newtimes.co.rw/news/index.php?i=14845&a=48278
http://www.kootazur.com/team-koot-azur/players/
http://www.ruhagoyacu.com/spip.php?page=impression_article&id_article=3277

1985 births
Living people
People from Kigali
Rwandan footballers
Rwanda international footballers
Belgian footballers
K.V. Mechelen players
Paris FC players

Association football wingers